Sergiusz Pinkwart (born 22 May 1973 in Warsaw) is a Polish writer, traveler, journalist and classical musician. He is the author of novels, books for children and travel guides, and is also a radio and press journalist and TV personality.

Career 
He is the son of Maciej Pinkwart, a writer and historian from Zakopane. He made his debut in 1987 with the collection of stories Fairy Tales from The Tatra Mountains. He graduated from the Fryderyk Chopin University in Warsaw. From 1994, for several years he combined his musical career as a violist in the Polish Radio Symphony Orchestra and on "Polish Broadway" – ROMA Musical Theater with journalistic work as the head of the foreign departments in magazines: Viva!, Gala., PANI Magazine. He was specialized in interviews with world famous actors, musicians, filmmakers and politicians, he conducted interviews with Woody Allen, Hillary Clinton, Madeleine Allbright, Harrisson Ford, Angelina Jolie, Brad Pitt, Hugh Grant, Catherine Zeta-Jones and hundreds more. For many years he was accredited as an official Polish journalist representative in Hollywood and by the Cannes Film Festival. He was a music consultant of the Polish edition of the autobiography of the Oscar winner Burt Bacharach. He writes books for children and adults. Theatre plays for children were based on his books Zaczarowana Wigilia (Magic Christmas Eve) and Podróże z fantazją. Bajka muzyczna (Traveling with Fantasy). Columnist for Read & Fly Magazine and in English for The First News. After completing his musical career, he collaborates with the ROMA Musical Theater as a writer and a specialist of the history of this cultural institution. He runs the travel program Baby on Board on the Polish National Radio. As a TV personality he takes part in public debates in mainstream media. His book Gambia. The Smiling Coast, published by National Geographic, was awarded the main Magellan Award for the best illustrated guide. From 2018 he is the star and host of the yearly gala concert of the Great Orchestra of Christmas Charity in Liverpool

Personal life 
In 2015 he moved to Liverpool, United Kingdom. Lives in Bootle. He is active in the Merseyside County Polish organisations and associations and Polish émigré press. Married to journalist and travel writer Magdalena Pinkwart, father of four children: Wiktor, Liwia, Wilhelm and Lara.

Works 

 Bajki Tatrzańskie, PTTK Kraj Publishing, 1987
 Nagrania Stefana Kamasy w Archiwum Polskiego Radia, Chopin University of Music, 1997
 Cień Kilimandżaro, Albatros Publishing, 2010
 Les Miserables. Narodziny sztuki, Wydawnictwo Teatru Muzycznego ROMA, 2011
 Podróże z fantazją. Bajka muzyczna, Akapit-Press Publishing, 2011
 Zaczarowana Wigilia, Akapit-Press Publishing, 2011
 Tata reporter, Wydawnictwo Akapit-Press Publishing, 2011
 Klub Racjonalistek, Albatros Publishing, 2013
 Tutaj drzwi trzeba otwierać powoli, Stowarzyszenie Szkoła Liderów Publishing, 2013
 Gambia. Kraina uśmiechu, National Geographic Publishing, 2014
 Drakulcio ma kłopoty. Urodzinowa katastrofa, Akapit-Press Publishing, 2015
 Drakulcio ma kłopoty. Mecz stulecia, Akapit-Press Publishing, 2015
 Kulinarne podróże po Chorwacji, National Geographic Publishing, 2015 (co-author with Anna Olej-Kobus, Krzysztof Kobus, Magdalena Pinkwart)
 Drakulcio ma kłopoty. Klątwa faraona, Akapit-Press Publishing, 2016
 Gdańsk. Przewodnik Turystyczny, Urząd Miejski w Gdańsku, Gdańska Organizacja Turystyczna, 2017
 Drakulcio ma kłopoty. Mistrz jazdy na krechę, Akapit-Press Publishing, 2017
 Drakulcio ma kłopoty. Włoska awantura, Akapit-Press Publishing, 2017
 Straszliwa historia w obrazkach, Akapit-Press Publishing, 2017
 Maria Czubaszek. Ostatni dymek, Czerwone i Czarne Publishing, 2017
 Pati i Jędrek mali strażnicy Tatr. Na górskim szlaku, Tatrzański Park Narodowy Publishing, 2017
 Mikołaj i dziewczyna z gwiazd, Akapit-Press Publishing, 2017
 Drakulcio ma kłopoty. Jak zjeść francuską żabę, Akapit-Press Publishing, 2018
 Warto marzyć, Wydawnictwo Teatru Muzycznego ROMA, 2019
 Wyspy Owcze z pierwszej ręki. Praktyczny przewodnik turystyczny, Lara Books Publishing, 2020

Filmography 

 Romeo i Julia, 2004
 Supermarket, 2012
 Big Love, 2012

Awards 

 2014 Magellan Award for the Best Illustrated Guide for the book The Gambia. The Smiling Coast, National Geographic Publishing House
 2019 Award of the Association of The Polish Journalists Travellers Globtroter for the Best Travel Publications of the Year
 2021 Magellan Award for the Best Illustrated Guide for the book Faroe Islands at First Hand, Lara Books Publishing House

External links 
 
 Sergiusz Pinkwart on Filmpolski.pl (pol.)
 Interview with Sergiusz Pinkwart Kurier365.pl, 13 October 2013
 Sergiusz Pinkwart's columns The First News, 2019–2020
 Travel blog by Sergiusz Pinkwart Keep Calm and Travel, 2013–2020
 Travel broadcast by Sergiusz Pinkwart Polish National Radio, 2015–2020
 Interview with Sergiusz Pinkwart. The Faroe Islands are a tasty morsel for globetrotters VIP Magazyn, 24 May 2020

References 

Polish radio journalists
Chopin University of Music alumni
1973 births
Polish violists
Polish television personalities
Polish travel writers
Polish emigrants to the United Kingdom
20th-century Polish male writers
Living people